Stephen Decatur Engle (December 18, 1837 – January 24, 1921) of Sybertsville, Pennsylvania was an American inventor best known as the creator of the Engle Monumental Clock, a clockwork described at the time as The 8th Wonder of The World.

References

1837 births
1921 deaths
American inventors